Al Khalfia is a town and rural commune in Fquih Ben Salah Province, Béni Mellal-Khénifra, Morocco. At the time of the 2004 census, the commune had a total population of 14,341 people living in 2555 households.

References

Populated places in Fquih Ben Salah Province
Rural communes of Béni Mellal-Khénifra